The year 1976 was the 195th year of the Rattanakosin Kingdom of Thailand. It was the 31st year in the reign of King Bhumibol Adulyadej (Rama IX), and is reckoned as year 2519 in the Buddhist Era. It is most significantly marked by the Thammasat University massacre on 6 October, which brought an end to a three-year period of civilian rule.

Incumbents
King: Bhumibol Adulyadej 
Crown Prince: Vajiralongkorn
Prime Minister:
 until 20 April: Kukrit Pramoj
20 April – 6 October: Seni Pramoj
6 October - 8 October: National Administrative Reform Council (junta)
starting 8 October: Thanin Kraivichien
Supreme Patriarch: Ariyavangsagatayana VII

 
Years of the 20th century in Thailand
Thailand
Thailand
1970s in Thailand